The 1979 Cork Intermediate Hurling Championship was the 70th staging of the Cork Intermediate Hurling Championship since its establishment by the Cork County Board in 1909. The draw for the opening round fixtures took place at the Cork Convention on 4 February 1979. The championship began on 11 May 1979 and ended on 19 August 1979.

On 19 August 1979, Éire Óg won the championship following a 7–11 to 5–08 defeat of Mallow in the final at Páirc Uí Chaoimh. This was first ever championship title.

Results

First round

Quarter-finals

Semi-finals

Final

References

Cork Intermediate Hurling Championship
Cork Intermediate Hurling Championship